Bark (2014) is a short story collection by American author Lorrie Moore.

Reception
Bark was short-listed for the Story Prize in 2014.  The collection was also short-listed for the Frank O'Connor International Short Story Award and was among Publishers Weeklys Top 10 Books of 2014.

The Washington Post book reviewer Heller McAlpin described the volume as a "powerful collection about the difficulty of letting go of love."

References

American short story collections
2014 short story collections
Alfred A. Knopf books